Henry Vernon Esmond (30 November 1869 – 17 April 1922) was a British actor and playwright.

Esmond was born Harry Esmond Jack in Hampton Court, Middlesex, the son of Richard George Jack, a physician and surgeon and his wife Mary Rynd. He was baptised on 22 February 1870 at the Church of St Mary, Hampton Court, Middlesex. He began his career as an actor in London in 1889 where he had several successes in comedies. He began writing plays, usually comedies, while in his early twenties. These plays were very popular and were also highly fashionable with their themes of light-hearted romance appealing to the audience of the day. He toured with a number of these plays and co-starred in them with his wife, Eva Moore.

His plays were also well received in the United States where nine of them were produced on Broadway between 1899 and 1907. For the next Broadway production, Eliza Comes to Stay, Esmond travelled to New York to appear alongside his wife and the popular actor Leslie Banks. This proved to be the greatest success of his career. He continued writing, acting and touring until his sudden death in Paris caused by pneumonia. He is buried in the Old Cemetery of Saint-Germain-en-Laye near Paris.

He was the father of the actress Jill Esmond.

References

External links 

 

English male stage actors
1869 births
1922 deaths
19th-century English male actors
20th-century English male actors
19th-century English writers
19th-century British dramatists and playwrights
20th-century English dramatists and playwrights
Deaths from pneumonia in France
English male dramatists and playwrights
19th-century English male writers
20th-century English male writers